The National Futsal League is a futsal league in England. It is a Community Interest Company owned and controlled by its Member Clubs and administered by an annually elected Board of Directors. 

The league is played under FIFA rules, began in 2008, and featured 57 teams in the 3 division pyramid for the 2018-19 season: FA Futsal Super League, Division 1 (North and South), and Division 2 (North, South, and Midlands). The FA National Futsal Super League was the highest level of futsal within England. The national champions become England's representatives in the UEFA Futsal Cup.

In the 2019/20 season, the National Futsal League consisted of the Premiership North, Premiership South, Championship North, Championship Midlands, and Championship South. The league ended due to Covid-19 and the clubs voted to finish the league on a point per game system.

The 2020/2021 season did not take place due to Covid-19 restrictions

The 2021/2022 season started in September with 4 regional divisions North, South, East, and West.

Champions
* 2019-20 season was decided, after a Member Club vote, on Points Per Game when the season ended due to COVID-19.

External links 
National Futsal League website

Futsal competitions in England
Football leagues in England
Sports leagues established in 2008
2008 establishments in England
England
Professional sports leagues in the United Kingdom